Dindori Assembly constituency is one of the 288 Vidhan Sabha (legislative assembly) constituencies of Maharashtra state in western India. It is reserved for Scheduled Tribes (ST) community.

Overview
Dindori (दिंडोरी) Vidhan Sabha seat is part of the Dindori Lok Sabha constituency along with five other Vidhan Sabha segments, namely Chandwad, Kalvan, Nandgaon, Niphad and Yeola. All the constituencies are situated in Nashik district.

Members of Legislative Assembly
 1990 - Bhagwantrao Gaikwad, Indian National Congress
 1995 - Kisan Govind Charoskar, Indian National Congress
 1999 - Ramdas Kisanrao Charoskar, Nationalist Congress Party
 2004 - Narhari Sitaram Zirwal, Nationalist Congress Party
 2009 - Dhanraj Mahale, Shiv Sena
 2014 - Narhari Sitaram Zirwal, Nationalist Congress Party
 2019 - Narhari Sitaram Zirwal, Nationalist Congress Party

Election results

Assembly Elections 2004

Assembly Elections 2009

Assembly Elections 2014

See also
 Dindori, Maharashtra
 List of constituencies of Maharashtra Vidhan Sabha

References

Assembly constituencies of Nashik district
Assembly constituencies of Maharashtra